Jules Sedney Harbour is the main seaport for cargo ships in Paramaribo, Suriname. Until 2016, the harbour was called Nieuwe Haven (New Harbour). It is one of the two main cargo ports of Suriname. The other being Nieuw-Nickerie. Paramaribo used to have a generic harbour at Waterkant. In 1965, Nieuwe Haven opened as a specialised cargo harbour.

History
In 1683, Suriname was captured by the Dutch Republic from the British. The Suriname River near the village of Paramaribo was more than one kilometre wide, and Waterkant, the water side, became the main harbour for the colony. In the mid 20th century, the harbour became ill-suited for large cargo ships. In 1965, Nieuwe Haven was opened as a specialised cargo harbour. The ferries still use the old facilities at Waterkant. On 11 November 1971,  was founded to operate the Nieuwe Haven.

The harbour was enlarged with a dedicated oil terminal. The harbour was originally designed for bulk transport, it was later rehabilitated for container transport. On 11 November 2016, the harbour was renamed Jules Sedney Harbour after Prime minister Jules Sedney as recognition for his involvement in the founding of the harbour.

References

External links

 Official site (in Dutch)

Ports and harbours in Suriname
Paramaribo